This is a list of national swimming records for Spain. These are the fastest times ever swum by a swimmer representing the country.

These records are kept by Spain's national swimming federation: Royal Spanish Swimming Federation (RFEN).

Information listed here is based on an update published August 19, 2013. A listing of the records can be found on the RFEN website here .

Long course (50 m)

Men

Women

Mixed relay

Short course (25 m)

Men

Women

Mixed relay

References
General
Spanish Long Course Records 26 December 2022 updated
Spanish Short Course Records 26 December 2022 updated
Specific

External links
Royal Spanish Swimming Federation web site
Records subpage of the RFEN website.

Spain
Records
Swimming
Swimming